Richard Spence may refer to:
 Richard Spence (director), British film director and writer
 Richard B. Spence, American historian
 Dick Spence, English footballer

See also
 Richard Spencer (disambiguation)